Military Scenario Definition Language (MSDL) is a standard developed by Simulation Interoperability Standards Organization (SISO).

The MSDL is now incorporated within the C2SIM Development group within SISO 

Version 1.  SISO-STD-007-2008: Military Scenario Definition Language (MSDL)

Links

References

Military simulation
Specification languages